Banaro is a Ramu language of Papua New Guinea. It is lexically divergent from the other branches of the family, having remarkably few cognates.

References

Ramu languages
Languages of East Sepik Province
Languages of Madang Province